The Puerto Rico municipal police is the group of local police forces of the different municipalities of Puerto Rico. Each municipal police operates independently and autonomously from one another with the mayor of the respective municipality being its commander-in-chief. As a whole, the forces do not constitute a body and are not required by law to do so. The different municipal forces were created by Law No. 19 of 1977.

Vehicles used by municipal police can usually be differentiated by their having blue and green flashing lights.  Those used by the state police have blue flashing lights.

By municipality

 Adjuntas
 Aguada
 Aguadilla
 Aguas Buenas
 Aibonito
 Añasco
 Arecibo
 Arroyo
 Barceloneta
 Barranquitas
 Bayamón
 Cabo Rojo
 Caguas
 Camuy
 Canóvanas
 Carolina
 Cataño
 Cayey
 Ceiba
 Ciales
 Cidra
 Coamo
 Comerío
 Corozal
 Culebra
 Dorado

 Fajardo
 Florida
 Guánica
 Guayama
 Guayanilla
 Guaynabo
 Gurabo
 Hatillo
 Hormigueros
 Humacao
 Isabela
 Jayuya
 Juana Díaz
 Juncos
 Lajas
 Lares
 Las Marías
 Las Piedras
 Loíza
 Luquillo
 Manatí
 Maricao
 Maunabo
 Mayagüez
 Moca
 Morovis

 Naguabo
 Naranjito
 Orocovis
 Patillas
 Peñuelas
 Ponce
 Quebradillas
 Rincón
 Río Grande
 Sabana Grande
 Salinas
 San Germán
 San Juan
 San Lorenzo
 San Sebastián
 Santa Isabel
 Toa Alta
 Toa Baja
 Trujillo Alto
 Utuado
 Vega Alta
 Vega Baja
 Vieques
 Villalba
 Yabucoa
 Yauco

References

Law enforcement agencies of Puerto Rico
 
1977 establishments in Puerto Rico
Government agencies established in 1977